The 2017 Destination X (aka Impact!: Destination X)  was a professional wrestling event produced by Global Force Wrestling (GFW) promotion, which took place on August 17, 2017 at the Impact Zone in Orlando, Florida. It was the thirteenth event under the Destination X chronology. It was featured as a live special edition of GFW's weekly broadcast of Impact!.

Five professional wrestling matches were contested at the event. The main event featured Matt Sydal defeating Lashley, with the winner earning a title shot at any GFW championship of his choice. On the undercard, Sonjay Dutt retained the X Division Championship against Trevor Lee in a ladder match and Sienna retained the Knockouts Championship against Gail Kim. The final round of the Super X Cup Tournament took place at the event, in which Dezmond Xavier defeated Taiji Ishimori to win the tournament and Ohio Versus Everything (Dave Crist and Jake Crist) made their GFW debut at the event. The event also marked the returns of Jim Cornette, Petey Williams and Taryn Terrell to GFW.

Event

Preliminary matches
The event kicked off with Sienna defending the Unified Knockouts Championship against Gail Kim. Kim nailed an Eat Defeat to Sienna but KM distracted the referee and Kim knocked off KM from the apron, which allowed Taryn Terrell to hit a Taryn Cutter to Kim. Sienna then nailed an AK47 to Kim to retain the title.

After the match, the executive Bruce Prichard declared that he would be awarding the vacant Unified World Championship to Lashley. However, Jim Cornette came out to announce that he was the new executive and fired Prichard and then decided that a Gauntlet for the Gold would take place for the vacant title on the following week's Impact!.

Next, the final round of the 2017 Super X Cup tournament took place between Dezmond Xavier and Taiji Ishimori. Ishimori nailed a 450° splash to Xavier for a near-fall and then Xavier nailed a Jocay-le to Ishimori to win the tournament.

Next, Sonjay Dutt defended the X Division Championship against Trevor Lee in a ladder match. Caleb Konley interfered in the match on Lee's behalf while Dutt was climbing the ladder to retrieve the title belt and attacked Konley until Petey Williams made his return to GFW and delivered a Canadian Destroyer to Konley, allowing Dutt to knock Lee off the ladder and retrieve the title belt to retain the title.

In the penultimate match of the event, Ohio Versus Everything (Dave Crist and Jake Crist) made their GFW debut against enhancement talents Jason Cade and Zachary Wentz. oVe knocked out Cade with the high low kick for the win.

Main event match
In the main event, Matt Sydal took on Lashley in which the winner would get a GFW title shot of his choosing. Lashley blocked a shooting star press by Sydal by raising his knees up and attempted to hit a spear but Sydal sidestepped it and rolled him up for the win.

Reception
Larry Csonka of 411 Mania gave a rating of 5.5 to Destination X, considering "the card was good on paper, even with losing the GFW title match" and criticized GFW on reversion to "interference in title matches, old names returning, and some sort of authority figure/power struggle angle." According to him, "the matches greatly under delivered, mostly average, especially the X-division matches." He thought that Destination X "had a ton of potential," but "failed to deliver and felt like the usual poorly planned “reboot” style episode we get from the company. This wasn’t the best first step on the road to Bound for Glory; you have to do better when there's so much product out there to choose from."

Results

Tournament bracket

References

Destination X
2017 in professional wrestling
August 2017 sports events in the United States
2017 in professional wrestling in Florida
Professional wrestling shows in Orlando, Florida
2017 American television episodes
2010s American television specials